The Valera Shale is a geologic formation in Texas. It preserves fossils dating back to the Permian period.

See also

 List of fossiliferous stratigraphic units in Texas
 Paleontology in Texas

References
 

Shale formations of the United States
Permian geology of Texas